Edevaldo Grimaldi (born 6 June 1984) is an Italian-Brazilian former professional footballer who played as a defender in the third and fourth tiers of Italian football.

Club career
Grimaldi joined Sassuolo in 2004, from Serie B club Perugia, in co-ownership deal. Grimaldi was the starting right-back of the team. He played in 2005, 2006 and 2007 playoffs. In the last season, which Sassuolo became the group stage champion of 2007–08 Serie C1, Grimaldi only played 12 times. However Grimaldi was able to play in 2008 Supercoppa di Lega di Prima Divisione, winning Salernitana to become the grand champion of the third division. At the start of 2008–09 Serie B, Grimaldi picked no.23 shirt, but left the club on loan on 1 September 2008.

In July 2009 he was signed by Paganese.

International career
Grimaldi was an unused member of the Italy national under-16 football team during the team's 2001 UEFA European Under-16 Football Championship qualification campaign. The following season, UEFA changed the age limit to under-17 and 19 respectively. Grimaldi was capped for the first time ever with the reformed Italy U18 side, a feeder team of the U19 side, on 20 March 2002. Grimaldi came on as a substitute for Mauro Belotti in the 77th minute. He was not called up to the U19 squad for 2003 UEFA European Under-19 Football Championship qualification in 2002–03 season, however.

Honours
Sassuolo
 Supercoppa di Lega di Prima Divisione: 2008
 Lega Pro Prima Divisione: 2008

References

External links
 FIGC 
 Football.it Profile 

Italian footballers
A.C. Perugia Calcio players
U.S. Sassuolo Calcio players
Calcio Lecco 1912 players
Paganese Calcio 1926 players
Association football fullbacks
1984 births
Living people